A jangseung or village guardian is a Korean totem pole usually made of wood. Jangseungs were traditionally placed at the edges of villages to mark village boundaries and frighten away demons. They were also worshipped as village tutelary deities.

In the southern regions of Jeolla, Chungcheong, and Gyeongsang, jangseungs are also referred to as beopsu or beoksu, a variation of boksa (복사/卜師), meaning a male shaman.

In the Jeolla region, jangseungs are often made of stone bearing some resemblance to the dolhareubangs of Jeju Island.

In Seoul, 18th century Joseon Dynasty King Jeongjo ordered jangseungs erected in the area near Sangdo to ward off evil spirits when he made a royal procession to Suwon, where his father's tomb was located. Since then, the district has been called Jangseungbaegi and has given its name to the Jangseungbaegi Station on the Seoul Metropolitan Subway's Line 7.

Jangseungs are usually adorned with inscriptions describing the personae of the carved figures along the front of the poles. "Male" jangseungs usually bear inscriptions in Hangul or Hanja reading "Great General of All Under Heaven," or Cheonha-daejanggun (Hangul: 천하대장군, Hanja: 天下大將軍) and are decorated with headpieces resembling those worn by Korean aristocrats or scholars. "Female" jangseungs, on the other hand, wear less elaborate headpieces and usually bear inscriptions reading "Female General of the Underworld," or Jiha-yeojanggun (Hangul: 지하여장군, Hanja: 地下女將軍) or "Great General of the Underworld," or Jiha-daejanggun (Hangul: 지하대장군, Hanja: 地下大將軍).

Place 
Depending on the location or affiliation, jangseung can be divided into village guardian, temple guardian, and public guardian.

The village guardian is the god of dongje, and has the functions of village guardian, mural, expelling the harmful ghosts, fire prevention, and gathering happiness for the village.

The temple guardian post has the function of protecting the temple from the invisible evil spirits. The temple guardian is the boundary mark of the temple.

The public guardian is a milestone and a street god to protect the safety of the gate, barracks, and roads and sea roads.

Gallery

See also

Dolhareubang
Korean shamanism
Pole worship
Religion in Korea
Seonangdang

References

External links

Jangseung (Totem Poles) - An Object of Worship
"Totem poles: Endangered folk icons from the past" from Korea Now.

Religion in Korea
Korean culture
Liminal deities
Outdoor sculptures
Korean mythology
Totem poles
Korean folk religion